Lieutenant-Colonel Sir Charles Benjamin Cutler KBE, ED (20 April 1918 – 23 September 2006) was an Australian politician, holding office for 28 years as an elected member of the New South Wales Legislative Assembly for Orange. Cutler was Country Party leader for sixteen years and became Minister for Education and Deputy Premier for ten years under Premiers Robert Askin and Tom Lewis.

Early life
Charles Cutler was born in Forbes in 1918, the son of George Cutler and Elizabeth Booth Cutler. His cousin, Sir Arthur Roden Cutler, was a Victoria Cross recipient and a long-serving Governor of New South Wales. Charles' ministerial service including as Deputy Premier commenced the year before his  cousin's appointment as governor, meaning that Charles was in the cabinet that recommended Roden as governor to the Queen and that later Charles was sworn in as a minister in by his governor cousin. 
At an early age, Charles moved to the nearby regional city of Orange with his family, where he was educated at Orange Rural School and Orange High School. After completing his schooling he gained employment from 1934 until 1939 as an office worker with the Producers Co-Operative Distributing Society Limited of Orange.

Military service
Cutler served in World War II, first as a member of the Citizens Military Force (CMF; now known as the Australian Army Reserve) from 1938 to 1940. He went on to serve with the 2nd Australian Imperial Force (2nd AIF) from 1940 until 1945 and also the 2/17th Battalion in Tobruk and Syria. He was wounded at El Alamein.

Following the war, Charles Cutler was a Lieutenant-Colonel in the CMF from 1948 to 1960 at which time he transferred to the Reserve Forces. Cutler was awarded the Efficiency Decoration (ED) in 1959.

Personal life
Charles Cutler married Dorothy Pascoe on 4 March 1943 in the Holy Trinity Church at Orange; they had one daughter and three sons. Following World War II, Cutler returned to his employment at Producers Co-operative Distributing Society Limited in Orange from 1946 to 1947. During this time, he was also a sportswriter for the Bathurst Times newspaper. He also became the vice-president of the Orange Returned Serviceman's League Club and also president of the Orange Apex Club and district rugby union.

Political career
Charles Cutler joined the Country Party in 1944. He was elected as the Member for the Electoral district of Orange at the New South Wales Legislative Assembly on 3 May 1947. He was re-elected in 1950, 1953, 1956, 1959, 1962, 1965, 1968, 1971 and 1973 – ten times in total. In 1958, he was elected as the Deputy Leader of the Country Party, and in 1959, he became party leader, a position he held for 16 years.

On 13 May 1965, he became Deputy Premier, Minister for Education and Minister for Science under the newly elected Liberal Party Premier Robert Askin, in NSW's first non-Labor government in 24 years. In later years, he also held portfolios as Minister for Local Government, Minister for Highways and Minister for Tourism. For several months in 1968 and 1972, he was Acting Premier and Treasurer in Askin's absence. He remained as Deputy Premier for most of 1975 under Tom Lewis after Askin's retirement that year.

In 1973, Cutler was appointed a Knight Commander of the Order of the British Empire (KBE). In 1974, Sir Charles led New South Wales at the Premier's Conference and Loan Council. On 16 December 1975, Sir Charles retired from the New South Wales Parliament after serving continuously as a member for 28 years, 7 months and 14 days.

Later life

Sir Charles Cutler retired to his home at Orange. He became a member of the Former Members of New South Wales Parliament Association. From 1976 to 1978, he was a director of the Sun Alliance Insurance Group. From 1978 to 1988, he was the Chairman of that organisation.

Sir Charles, who had been suffering from cancer, died at the age of 88 on 23 September 2006 in hospital in Orange.

New South Wales National Party Leader Andrew Stoner said that Sir Charles Cutler's commitment to building stronger rural communities was legendary.

"He was responsible for creating a separate Department of Decentralisation and Development and helping strengthen country communities through the establishment of a Country Industries Assistance Fund."

Former Nationals Leader and Deputy Prime Minister Tim Fischer, who served under Sir Charles Cutler, says his contribution to education and infrastructure in rural areas was underestimated. 
"He made a giant contribution to the educational resources of the state of New South Wales," Mr Fischer said.

Honours

Cutler was appointed a Knight Commander of the Order of the British Empire (KBE) in the Civil division on 1 January 1973 for service as Deputy Premier of New South Wales.

On 1 January 2001, Cutler was awarded the Centenary Medal for service to Australian society through parliament.

References

   

1918 births
2006 deaths
People educated at Orange High School (New South Wales)
Australian Anglicans
Australian Army personnel of World War II
Australian colonels
Australian corporate directors
Journalists from New South Wales
Australian sports journalists
Members of the New South Wales Legislative Assembly
National Party of Australia members of the Parliament of New South Wales
Deputy Premiers of New South Wales
Australian Knights Commander of the Order of the British Empire
Australian politicians awarded knighthoods
Recipients of the Centenary Medal
Deaths from cancer in New South Wales
20th-century Australian politicians
People from Orange, New South Wales